Hammal O Mahganj is a Pakistani Balochi-language film released in 1976. It is known as the first feature Balochi film. The film could not make it to the cinemas due to political pressure. The film was produced by Anwar Iqbal who also played the lead role in the film along with Nadir Shah Adil, Aneeta Gul, Saqi and Noor Mohammad Lashari. Set in the 15th century when Portuguese discovered Indian subcontinent, the story revolves around a man who stands against the Portuguese for the honour of his motherland. The film was screened in 2017 on 28 February, Baloch Culture day.

Cast 
 Anwar Iqbal
 Nadir Shah Adil
 Aneeta Gul
 Saqi
 Noor Mohammad Lashari
 Shakeel Laasi

References 

Balochi-language films
Pakistani drama films
1976 films